Harrow is an Australian television drama series, which ran for three series of ten episodes each. The first series premiered on ABC on 9 March 2018. The second began on 12 May 2019, while the third started on 7 February 2021. The series was created by Stephen M. Irwin and Leigh McGrath, who are also its scriptwriters, and stars Ioan Gruffudd. Gruffudd made his directorial debut during the third series in February 2021.

The series revolves around the titular Daniel Harrow (Gruffudd), a Queensland-based forensic pathologist. Each episode finds Daniel solving a specific case with the assistance of Brisbane police officer, Soroya Dass (Mirrah Foulkes) and fellow pathologists Grace Molyneux (Jolene Anderson) and Simon Van Reyk (Remy Hii). Alongside these cases are more long-term concerns revolving around Daniel's private life and family.

Premise

Harrow details the life and work of Dr. Daniel Harrow, a Queensland-based forensic pathologist, who often disregards authority. He has an empathy for the dead, which helps to solve bizarre cases. Daniel is willing to bend rules and use unorthodox procedures in his determination to give victims a voice and reveal the truth behind what happened to them. Meanwhile, a secret from his past threatens his career, his family, and himself.

Cast

Main
 Ioan Gruffudd as Dr. Daniel Harrow, senior forensic pathologist at the fictitious Queensland Institute of Forensic Medicine (QIFM), intelligent and unconventional scientist who delves for the real reasons people have died, but he hides his own dark secrets.
 Mirrah Foulkes as Sergeant Soroya Dass, Queensland Police uniformed criminal investigator, and Daniel's love interest (series 1).
 Remy Hii as Simon Van Reyk, junior forensic pathologist, Daniel's assistant and protégé (series 1–2).
 Anna Lise Phillips as Stephanie Tolson, Daniel's ex-wife, Fern's mother, and a primary school teacher (series 1–2).
 Darren Gilshenan as Lyle Ridgewell Livingston Fairley, senior forensic pathologist at QIFM, conventional and meticulous, he remains in Daniel's shadow as less flamboyant.
 Damien Garvey as Bryan Nichols, Detective Senior Sergeant at Queensland Police's Criminal Investigation Branch. Though Daniel irritates him, they respect each other professionally.
 Ella Newton as Fern Harrow, Daniel and Stephanie's daughter, who has been living on the streets for two years.
 Hunter Page-Lochard as Callan Prowd, Fern's boyfriend, convicted drug seller.
 Robyn Malcolm as Maxine Aleksandra Pavich, Director of QIFM and Daniel's boss, Bryan's love interest (series 1–2).
 Tony Barry as Jack Twine, Daniel's ex-boss at QIFM and long-time mentor, nursing home resident (series 1).
 Jolene Anderson as Dr. Grace Molyneux, Lyle's niece, junior forensic pathologist at QIFM, former neurosurgeon. Daniel's love interest (series 2–3).

Recurring and guest
 Faustina Agolley as Edwina Gharam, surgery nurse, becomes QIFM's new assistant forensic pathologist (series 2–3).
 Grant Bowler as Francis Andrew Chester, convicted serial killer, identified by Laurie as dying in a prison fire six months ago (series 2).
 Miriama Smith as Renae Warrington, Maxine's replacement as QIFM director, hired to implement quotas and cost-cutting restructure, shares custody of son, Louie (series 3).
 Harrison Gilbertson as James Reed, Tanya's son, he claims to be Daniel's long-estranged English-born son (series 3).
 Uli Latukefu as Jesse Walsh, Stephanie's boyfriend (series 1).
 Diana Glenn as Mila Zoric, businesswoman, mother of Max (series 3).
 Tim Ross as Dr. Ben Patterson, paediatric surgeon, Grace's estranged, then divorced husband (series 3).
 Hugh Parker as Doug Hinton, Queensland Deputy Coroner (series 2–3).
 Tasneem Roc as Jill McCloud, Queensland police drug squad detective (series 1–2).
 Ditch Davey as Robert Quinn, former police sergeant, Stephanie's second husband, Fern's stepfather, missing for 10 months (series 1).
 Sara Wiseman as Tanya Ann Hain (previously Tanya Ann Reed), English woman, Daniel's long-ago girlfriend, mother of James (series 3).
Geoff Morrell as Dr. Laurie Badcoe, North Queensland forensic pathologist, previously Daniel's supervisor (series 2).
 Andrew Buchanan as Kiriakos, Queensland police Inspector (series 1).
 Josephine Flynn as "Detective": plain clothes Queensland police detective (series 2).
 Heather Mitchell as Louise Whitehall (previously Louise Chester), widow of Dr. Maurice Chester, Francis' mother (series 2).
 Anthony Standish as Tim Markides, chemist, employed Fern, gambler (series 2).
 Erroll Shand as Brendan Skene, ex-prisoner, gambler, illiterate, confesses to shooting Daniel (series 2).
 Ed Wightman as Yellowly, SOCO allied with police and QIFM (series 1).
 Sophia Emberson-Bain as Sage Wu, Ben's divorce lawyer, becomes his fiancée (series 3).
 Virginie Laverdure as Bec Crowley, Queensland police superintendent, Bryan's boss (series 2–3).
 Dorian Nkono as Lewison, underworld contact, known to Fern. (series 1).
 Oliver De Los Santos as Louie Warrington, Renae's young son, hangs around QIFM (series 3).
 Steven Lunavich as Dieter Schuh, pawnbroker, used by Fern and Daniel (series 1).
 Korey Williams as "Drug squad officer" (series 2) and "Henchman #2" (series 3).
 Gary Sweet as Bruce Reimers, Olivia's father, suspects her fiancé of killing Olivia (series 1).

Episodes

Series 1 (2018)

Series 2 (2019)

Series 3 (2021)

Production
The series, written by Stephen M. Irwin and created and produced by Leigh McGrath, was the first international drama production for the Disney-owned ABC Studios International, which teamed up on the project with Hoodlum Entertainment, the Australian Broadcasting Corporation and Screen Queensland. The location is Brisbane, including the offices and laboratories in the heritage-listed former Brisbane Dental Hospital and College. On 2 May 2018, ABC announced that they had commissioned a second series, with filming set to begin in September 2018. The second series began airing on 12 May 2019. On 10 October 2019 ABC renewed the programme for a third series with filming set to begin in November 2019 and confirmed Ioan Gruffudd would direct an episode.

Notes

References

External links
 

2018 Australian television series debuts
Australian Broadcasting Corporation original programming
2010s Australian crime television series
2010s Australian drama television series
English-language television shows
Television series by ABC Studios
Television shows set in Queensland
2020s Australian crime television series
2020s Australian drama television series
Australian mystery television series
2010s Australian medical television series
2020s Australian medical television series